Romeo Brown was a British comic strip published in the Daily Mirror from 1954 to 1962.

It was originally written and illustrated by Alfred Mazure; Mazure was replaced in 1957 by writer Peter O'Donnell and illustrator Jim Holdaway.  It featured the adventures of Romeo Brown, a dashing private detective and reluctant ladies' man.  The strip was cancelled unexpectedly by the chairman of the group who, according to O'Donnell, said he couldn't understand it.  O'Donnell had by this time completed the next adventure and Holdaway had illustrated the first 8 days' worth.

O'Donnell recalled in a 2002 interview: "This was a strip running in the tabloid Daily Mirror, for which I was writing "Garth". The editor was dissatisfied so he engaged Jim Holdaway to take over the drawing and asked me to write the scripts. That's how Jim and I first met, and we ran the strip for seven years, Romeo Brown was a comic private detective, and my brief was that every story was to revolve around a girl or girls, and the more clothes I could safely get off them the better."

O'Donnell followed Romeo Brown with the comic strip Modesty Blaise in the Evening Standard, which Holdaway illustrated from its debut on 13 May 1963 until his death in 1970.

List of Romeo Brown stories

References

External links
Romeo Brown - Thrillingdetective

British comic strips
Brown, Romeo
Brown, Romeo
Drama comics
Detective comics
1954 comics debuts
Brown, Romeo
Brown, Romeo
1962 comics endings